Second Album or 2nd Album may refer to:

 The Beatles' Second Album, a 1964 album by the Beatles
 Four Tops Second Album, a 1965 album by Four Tops
 Martin Carthy's Second Album, a 1966 album by Martin Carthy
 The Second Album (The Spencer Davis Group album), a 1966 album by the Spencer Davis Group
 Second Album (Curved Air album), a 1971 album by Curved Air
 Second Album, a 1973 album by Roy Buchanan
 Call Call Call, a 2005 album by U;Nee, also known as 2nd Album
 The Second Album (Latyrx album), a 2013 album by Latyrx
 Second, the second EP by Baroness

See also
 Second album syndrome
 Second (disambiguation)